Espérance de Tunis, a Tunisian professional association football club, has gained entry to Confederation of African Football (CAF) competitions on several occasions. They have represented Tunisia in the Champions League on twenty four occasions, the Confederation Cup on one occasion, the now-defunct Cup Winners' Cup four separate occasions, and the now-defunct CAF Cup one occasion.

History

Achieved three CAF Champions League (2010–2020)
The beginning was in the 2010 CAF Champions League where Espérance de Tunis reached the first final in ten years, The beginning of the journey was against East End Lions and ended with a score of 5–4, in the next round against ASFA Yennenga It ended in victory back and forth with 7–2 on Aggregate, in the last match before the group stage against the Sudanese club Al-Merrikh SC ended with a 4–1 victory on Aggregate, in the group stage draw, Espérance de Tunis fell in Group A with TP Mazembe, ES Sétif and Dynamos where did finish in first place with 13 points. Espérance faced Al Ahly SC from Egypt in the semi-final and lost the first leg 2–1 away from home. In need of a win in the second leg, Espérance were victorious 1–0 and reached the final on the away goals rule. In the final against TP Mazembe, Esperance received a heavy defeat in the first leg 5–0 at Stade Frederic Kibassa Maliba and in the second leg ended 1–1. In the same version, Nigerian striker Michael Eneramo won top goalscorers with 8 goals.
In the next version the goal was to achieve the title, in the first round against ASPAC FC from Benin where they won 5–2 on Aggregate, in the second round against ASC Diaraf won back and forth with 6–0 on Aggregate to qualify for the group stage. were drawn in Group B with Wydad Casablanca, MC Alger and Al Ahly SC finished in first place with 10 points to qualify for the semi-final, where they faced Al-Hilal Club ended with a 3–0 victory on Aggregate. to face in the final Wydad Casablanca Where finished the first leg 0–0 draw and in the second leg at Stade 7 November, Harrison Afful scored the winning goal and won the second title in its history after 17 years. To guarantee a seat in the FIFA Club World Cup for the first time where Espérance finished sixth after losing against Monterrey 3–2. On 25 February 2012, Espérance de Tunis faced Maghreb de Fès the CAF Confederation Cup champion in the CAF Super Cup final and ended in a 4–3 loss on penalties.In 2012 CAF Champions League Espérance de Tunis reached the final for the third time in a row, this time against Al Ahly SC of Egypt in the first leg at Borg El Arab Stadium, which ended in a 1–1 draw. As for the second leg, the surprise happened and Al Ahly SC won 1–2. after that Espérance de Tunis level appeared to decline, as in 2013 it was eliminated in the semi-final against Orlando Pirates on the away goals rule. in 2014 from the group stage included ES Sétif, CS Sfaxien and Al-Ahly Benghazi. and in 2015, the worst Where was eliminated in the second round against Al-Merrikh SC. In the 2018 CAF Champions League, Espérance de Tunis returned to its high level in the Preliminary round. It was easy to qualify against ASAC Concorde and in the first round against the Kenyan Gor Mahia, Espérance qualified to the group stage with the goal of Anice Badri. Were he finished second behind Al-Ahly to face in the Quarter-finals Étoile du Sahel where they won 3–1 on Aggregate, and in the Semi-finals Espérance won against Primeiro de Agosto 4–3 on Aggregate to reach the final after 6 years against the same Egyptian club Al-Ahly, but this time Espérance de Tunis won the title 4–3 on Aggregate. to qualify for the FIFA Club World Cup, where finished fifth after winning against Guadalajara 6–5 on penalties. Then in the 2019 CAF Super Cup against Raja Casablanca, played for the first time outside Africa in Qatar at Thani bin Jassim Stadium. ended with a 2–1 defeat.

CAF competitions

CAF Super Cup

FIFA Club World Cup

Non-CAF competitions

Statistics

By season
Information correct as of 22 April 2022.
Key

Pld = Played
W = Games won
D = Games drawn
L = Games lost
F = Goals for
A = Goals against
Grp = Group stage

PR = Preliminary round
R1 = First round
R2 = Second round
POR = Play-off round
R16 = Round of 16
QF = Quarter-final
SF = Semi-final

Key to colours and symbols:

By competition

In Africa
:

Non-CAF competitions
:

Statistics by country
Statistics correct as of game against Elect-Sport on 27 September 2019

CAF competitions

Non-CAF competitions

African competitions goals
Statistics correct as of game against Zamalek on 7 March 2023.

Hat-tricks

Two goals one match

Non-CAF competitions goals

African opponents by cities

Notes

References

Africa
Espérance Sportive de Tunis